Herón Agustín Escobar García (17 October 1954 – 24 October 2016) was a Mexican politician from the Labor Party. From 2009 to 2012 he served as Deputy of the LXI Legislature of the Mexican Congress representing Sinaloa. He died at the age of 62 in 2016.

References

1954 births
2016 deaths
People from Sinaloa
Labor Party (Mexico) politicians
21st-century Mexican politicians
Deputies of the LXI Legislature of Mexico
Members of the Chamber of Deputies (Mexico) for Sinaloa